Vitis monticola, commonly known as mountain grape, or sweet mountain grape, is a North American species of wild grape native to Texas. It is important to grape growers for its resistance to drought; a quality exploited both genetically in hybridization, and in grafting.

Gallery

References

monticola
Plants described in 1862
Flora of Texas